The National Civic Union (in Spanish Unión Cívica Nacional) was a liberal political party in Argentina formed in 1891 as the result of a split in the Civic Union, and dissolved in 1916. It based largely on the personality of its leader, Bartolomé Mitre.

Origin
See Civic Union of the Youth.

On April 13, 1890, supporters of the Civic Union of the Youth established the Civic Union in a ceremony at the Buenos Aires Frontón. Leandro N. Alem was elected president and leaders were drawn from all tendencies within the anti-government movement, including Francisco A. Barroetaveña, José Manuel Estrada, Pedro Goyena, Aristóbulo del Valle, Bernardo de Irigoyen, Juan B. Justo, Lisandro de la Torre, and influential ex-president and general Bartolomé Mitre.

The same year, supporters of the Civic Union, led by Leandro Alem and Bartolomé Mitre, instigated the Revolution of the Park, an armed uprising that ousted president Juárez Celman and replaced him with vice president Carlos Pellegrini.

The Civic Union established a presidential ticket with Bartolomé Mitre and Bernardo de Irigoyen. However, Julio Argentino Roca, undisputed leader of the pro-government National Autonomist Party, made a deal with Mitre to form a "national unity" ticket headed by Mitre. After learning of the arrangement on April 16, Leandro Alem opposed it emphatically, splitting the Civic Union and forcing Mitre to abandon his candidacy.

On June 26, Alem's supporters formally founded the Radical Civic Union. In response, Mitre's followers formed the National Civic Union. Members of the latter became known as the Civics, while those of the former became known as the Radicals.

Political activity
Apart from Bartolomé Mitre, politicians associated with the National Civic Union included Guillermo Udaondo and Honorio Pueyrredón.

The Civics and the Radicals proved to be close on most issues, and tended to collaborate. In 1896 the personal link between Mitre and Radical Bernardo de Irigoyen gave rise to the so-called política de las paralelas, whereby the two parties appointed candidates to a common electoral list. In 1897, in opposition to the política de las paralelas, Hipólito Yrigoyen dissolved the Radical Committee of the Province of Buenos Aires.

In 1916, when Radical candidate Yrigoyen won the presidential election, Pueyrredón proposed the dissolution of the National Civic Union. His proposal was accepted, with the majority of the party's members transferring their allegiance to the Radical Civic Union.

Electoral history

Works cited

See also
Bartolomé Mitre
Civic Union
Radical Civic Union

References

Defunct political parties in Argentina
Political parties established in 1891
Political parties disestablished in 1916
1891 establishments in Argentina
1916 disestablishments in Argentina